Erica Brown (born September 7, 1966) is an American writer and educator who lectures widely on subjects of Jewish interest and is scholar-in-residence for the Jewish Federation of Greater Washington, and a consultant to other Jewish organizations. Her "Weekly Jewish Wisdom" column has appeared regularly in The Washington Post.

Biography
Brown attended the Frisch School in New Jersey. She graduated Stern College of Yeshiva University and has master's degrees from Harvard and University of London. She received her doctorate in Jewish history from Baltimore Hebrew College. Brown was a Jerusalem Fellow.

She is an Avi Chai fellow, served as an adjunct professor at American University and George Washington University and is faculty member of the Wexner Foundation. Brown lives in Maryland with her husband and four children.

Books
 Inspired Jewish Leadership: Practical Approaches to Building Strong Communities, Jewish Light Publishing, trans. by Jang-Heum Ok.  Seoul, Korea: Dong Yeon Press, 2016
 Leadership in the Wilderness: Authority & Anarchy in the Book of Numbers, Maggid Books, a Division of Koren Publishers Jerusalem, 2013
 In the Narrow Places: Daily Inspiration for the Three Weeks, Maggid Books, a Division of Koren Publishers Jerusalem, 2011
 Confronting Scandal: How Jews Can Respond When Jews Do Bad Things, Jewish Lights Publishing, 2010
 Spiritual Boredom: Rediscovering the Wonder of Judaism, Jewish Lights Publishing, 2009
 The Case for Jewish Peoplehood: Can We Be One?, by Erica Brown, Misha Galperin, and Joseph Telushkin, 2009
 Inspired Jewish Leadership: Practical Approaches to Building Strong Communities, Jewish Lights Publishing, 2008
 Seder Talk: The Conversational Haggada, Maggid Books and OU Press, 2015.

External links
 

1966 births
Living people
Jewish American academics
Jewish biblical scholars
Jewish educators
Stern College for Women alumni
Harvard University alumni
Alumni of the University of London
American University faculty and staff
George Washington University faculty
Female biblical scholars
21st-century Jewish biblical scholars